Aspergillus mottae is a species of fungus in the genus Aspergillus first isolated from almonds and maize in Portugal. It is from the Flavi section. The species was first described in 2012.

Growth and morphology

A. mottae has been cultivated on both Czapek yeast extract agar (CYA) plates and Malt Extract Agar Oxoid® (MEAOX) plates. The growth morphology of the colonies can be seen in the pictures below.

References

Further reading

mottae
Fungi described in 2012